We're All Gonna Die may refer to:
We're All Gonna Die (album), a 2016 album by Dawes
"We're All Gonna Die", a song by Slash, from the album Slash
We're All Gonna Die (Even Jay Baruchel), a Canadian documentary television series

See also
We're All Going to Die, a song by Malcolm Middleton